William Harold Henry Siddons (17 September 19224 November 1963) was a British film and television actor, appearing in Genevieve, The Dam Busters, Appointment in London, They Who Dare, The Purple Plain, Quatermass and the Pit, A Night To Remember and The Wrong Arm of the Law. He served in Bomber Command during the Second World War as a flight engineer, latterly with 582 Squadron as the Flight Engineer Leader on its formation in April 1944 and is a descendant of Sarah Siddons.

Born in Belfast, Northern Ireland, on 17 September 1922, he was found dead in his car on 4 November 1963 aged 41, apparently by suicide. He was buried in the parish churchyard of Little Gaddesden, Hertfordshire, with the motto Per ardua ad astra on his gravestone.

Selected filmography

 Angels One Five (1952) - Pimpernel Pilot
 Gift Horse (1952) - Ship's Doctor
 Appointment in London (1953) - Saunders
 Genevieve (1953) - Policeman (uncredited)
 Malta Story (1953) - Matthews, Bomber Pilot (uncredited)
 The Clue of the Missing Ape (1953) - Naval Intelligence Officer (uncredited)
 They Who Dare (1954) - Lieut. Stevens R.N.
 The Good Die Young (1954) - Hospital Doctor (uncredited)
 Conflict of Wings (1954) - Flight Lt. Edwards 
 The Purple Plain (1954) - Navigator Williams (uncredited)
 The Dam Busters (1955) - Group Signals Officer
 I Am a Camera (1955) - Editor at Party
 The Blue Peter (1955) - Hughes
 The Baby and the Battleship (1956) - Whiskers
 The Last Man to Hang? (1956) - Cheed's Doctor
 Man in the Shadow (1957) - Colin Wells
 The Mark of the Hawk (1957) - 1st Officer
 The Silent Enemy (1958) - Army Interrogation Officer 
 Dunkirk (1958) - Doctor (uncredited)
 A Night to Remember (1958) - Second Officer Herbert Stone - Californian
 Battle of the V-1 (1958) - Master Bomber
 Harry Black (1958) - British Officer
 Danger Within (1959) - Capt. 'Tag' Burchnall
 The White Trap (1959) - Harry (uncredited)
 The Guns of Navarone (1961) - British Officer (uncredited)
 The Man in the Back Seat (1961) - Angry Resident (uncredited)
 Out of the Shadow (1961)
 The Piper's Tune (1962) - Sergeant
 The Wrong Arm of the Law (1963) - PC in Basement Garage (uncredited)

References

External links
 

1922 births
1963 deaths
Male film actors from Northern Ireland
Male television actors from Northern Ireland
Male actors from Belfast
20th-century British male actors
1963 suicides
Royal Air Force personnel of World War II
Suicides in England